Derrick Lee (born 1 October 1973) is a retired Scottish rugby union player who played for Watsonians, London Scottish and Edinburgh Rugby. He was noted for his line breaking ability and reliability under the high ball. An instinctive understanding of timing and angles resulted in him being at one point the top try-scorer of all time in the Celtic League although that record has since been broken.

International Rugby:

He is was picked to represent Indonesia under 19’s at the 1991 under 19’s Asia cup where he scored two tries against Hong Kong in the opening game.

He took his international debut against Ireland at Lansdowne Road on 7 February 1998. He earned 12 caps in total scoring 34 points with 1 try, 4 conversions and 7 penalties. He won his final cap also against Ireland at Lansdowne Road on 27 March 2004. He would have possibly won more caps had it not been for a run of injuries.

He announced his retirement from professional rugby in April 2005 due to persistent knee problems.

References

1973 births
Living people
Scottish rugby union players
Watsonians RFC players
Ayr RFC players
London Scottish F.C. players
Edinburgh Rugby players
Scotland international rugby union players
Rugby union fullbacks
Rugby union players from Ayr